The men's long jump competition of the athletics events at the 2015 Pan American Games will take place between the 21 and 22 of July at the CIBC Pan Am and Parapan Am Athletics Stadium. The defending Pan American Games champion is Daniel Pineda of Chile.

Records
Prior to this competition, the existing world and Pan American Games records were as follows:

Qualification

Each National Olympic Committee (NOC) was able to enter up to two entrants providing they had met the minimum standard (7.61) in the qualifying period (January 1, 2014 to June 28, 2015).

Schedule

Results
All results shown are in meters.

Qualification
Automatic qualifier 8.00m

Final

References

Athletics at the 2015 Pan American Games
2015